Hero of Artsakh is the highest title of the self-proclaimed Republic of Artsakh. According to the official website of the President of Artsakh, the title Hero of Artsakh "is awarded for exceptional services in the defense of the state, strengthening its economic might, and for creating significant national values."

Recipients of the title are decorated with the Order of the Golden Eagle.

In 2016 Robert Abajyan became the 24th "Hero of Artsakh" awardee, as well as the youngest person ever to hold the title at 19 years old.

During and after 2020 Nagorno-Karabakh war 23 servicemen were awarded the highest state title of "Hero of Artsakh".

Recipients
Samvel Babayan (Renounced in 2020)
Vazgen Sargsyan
Ashot Ghulian (posthumously)
Monte Melkonian (posthumously)
Seyran Ohanian
Robert Kocharyan
Kristapor Ivanyan (posthumously)
Manvel Grigoryan
Samvel Karapetian
Serzh Sargsyan
Petros Ghevondyan
Yura Poghosyan
Vitaly Balasanyan
Georgy Gasparyan
Vahagn Vardanyan
Movses Hakobyan
Zori Balayan
Arshavir Gharamyan
Arkady Ghukasyan
Arkady Ter-Tadevosyan
Shahen Meghrian (posthumously)
Pargev Martirosyan
Robert Abajyan (posthumously)
Artur Aghabekyan
Zhanna Galstyan
Leonid Azgaldyan (posthumously)
Vladimir Balayan
Armenak Urfanyan
Artur Mkrtchyan (posthumously)
Karen Jalavyan
David Grigoryan
Edgar Markosyan
Yura Alaverdyan
Sergey Shakaryan (posthumously)
David Ghazaryan (posthumously)
Armen Knyazyan
Suren Barseghyan
Alexander Harutyunyan
Menua Hovhannisyan (posthumously)
Jalal Harutyunyan
Ararat Melkumyan
 Rustam Gasparyan (posthumously)
 Karen Shakaryan (posthumously)
 Hunan Hayrumyan (posthumously)
 Hakob Harutyunyan (posthumously)
 Igor Muradyan (posthumously)
 Vigen Shirinyan (posthumously)
 Narek Hovhannisyan (posthumously)
 Tovmas Tovmasyan (posthumously)
 David Arushanyan (posthumously)
 Samvel Ghazaryan (posthumously)
 Alen Margaryan (posthumously)
 Artur Aghasyan (posthumously)
 Vardan Avetisyan
 Artur Alexanyan
 Samvel Gevorgyan
Albert Hovhannisyan (posthumously)

References 

 
Armenian awards
Hero (title)